Petr Chelčický (c. 1390 – c. 1460) was a Czech Christian spiritual leader and author in the 15th century Bohemia, now the Czech Republic. He was one of the most influential thinkers of the Bohemian Reformation. Petr Chelčický inspired the Unitas Fratrum who opposed transubstantiation, monasticism and insisted on the primacy of scripture and pacifism. There are multiple parallels with the teachings of the Anabaptists and Petr Chelčický.  Czech Baptists have also expressed continuity with the Bohemian reformation by identifying with Petr Chelčický.

His published works critiqued the immorality and violence of the contemporary church and state. He proposed a number of Bible-based improvements for human society, including nonresistance, which influenced humanitarians Tolstoy, Gandhi, and Martin Luther King. Paradoxically, the main part of the Hussite movement rejected his teachings of nonviolence, which eventually led to much violence among the Hussite movement. Chelcicky's teachings laid the foundation of the Unity of the Brethren.

Early life

Petr Chelčický is thought to have been born in southern Bohemia in about 1390, although one theory puts his birth as early as 1374. Very little is known about his personal history. Different historians have called him a serf, an independent farmer, a squire, a nobleman, a cobbler, a priest, and a Waldensian. On one occasion, Chelčický called himself a peasant, but this description is at odds with his ability to live in Prague from 1419 to 1421, his rudimentary knowledge of Latin, and the time he was able to devote to literary, political, and religious pursuits.

It is certain that he was unusually literate for a medieval man without a regular academic education. After 1421, he lived and farmed in the village of Chelčice, near Vodňany. He produced 56 known works, but the majority remain unpublished and inaccessible except in the original manuscripts. His thinking was influenced by Thomas of Štítný, John Wycliffe, Jan Hus, and the Waldensian tradition. He died around 1460.

Teachings
Petr Chelčický's teachings included ideas later adopted by the Moravians, Anabaptists, Quakers, and Baptists. He was the first pacifist writer of the Renaissance, predating Erasmus and Menno Simons by nearly 100 years.

Scripture 
Petr Chelčický believed in a strict adherence to the principle of sola scriptura and read the bible in the vernacular. His strict adherence to sola scriptura caused Petr Chelčický to occasionally contradict John Wycliffe and other Hussites. He rejected the papacy and Catholic hierarchy, believing that the early church had no pope, kings, lords, inquisitions or crusaders.

Peter believed that purgatory is an example of the Church corrupting the New Testament by adding traditions, thus he denied the doctrine of purgatory.

Church and state
Chelčický called the Pope and the emperor (the church and the state) "whales who have torn the net of true faith" because they established the church as the head of a secular empire. Chelčický believed that Christians should follow the law of love and so should not be compelled by state authority. He taught that the believer should not accept government office or even appeal to its authority, as for the true believer to take part in government was sinful. He argued that capital punishment and other forms of violent punishment were wrong. His positions on government are similar to the Christian anarchist principles of Leo Tolstoy. Tolstoy praised Chelčický's work in his 1894 book The Kingdom of God is Within You.

"The man who obeys God needs no other authority (over him)." — Petr Chelčický

Nonviolence and war

As early as 1420, Chelčický taught that violence should not be used in religious matters. Chelčický used the parable of the wheat and the tares to show that both the sinners and the saints should be allowed to live together until the harvest. He thought that it is wrong to kill even the sinful and that Christians should refuse military service. He argued that if the poor refused, the lords would have no one to go to war for them.

Chelčický taught that no physical power can destroy evil, and that Christians should accept persecution without retaliating. He believed that even defensive war was the worst evil and thought that soldiers were no more than murderers. He believed the example of Jesus and the Gospel was an example of peace.

Communal living
Chelčický believed that there must be complete equality in the Christian community. He said there should be no rich or poor since the Christian relinquished all property and status. He maintained that Christians could expel evil persons from their community but could not compel them to be good. He believed in equality but that the state should not force it upon society and went so far as to proffer that social inequality is a creature of the state and rises and falls with it.

According to Karl Kautsky in Communism in Central Europe in the Time of the Reformation, "The nature of the first organisation of the Bohemian Brethren is not at all clear, as the later Brothers were ashamed of their communistic origin, and endeavoured to conceal it in every possible way." Some of Chelčický's statements tend to indicate that he thought only the poor were genuine Christians.

Priesthood of the believer
Chelčický criticized the use of force in matters of faith. He taught that the Christian should strive for righteousness of his own free will but must not force others to be good and that goodness should be voluntary. He believed that the Christian must love God and one's neighbor and that is the way to convert people rather than by compulsion. He maintained that any type of compulsion is evil and that Christians should not participate in political struggles.

Sacraments 
Petr Chelčický advocated for baptism to be generally administered to those who are of later age. However he did not completely forbid infant baptism, allowing it if the parents would assure their education in the faith. He additionally did not propose re-baptism. Petr Chelčický did not believe that baptism by itself could save but is a part of the process of salvation which included instruction, confirmation and discipleship.

He additionally rejected transubstantiation but did not hold to memorialism which was taught by radical Hussites.

Other teachings 
Petr Chelčický based his teaching on the Sermon on the Mount, renouncing violence, bearing arms and oaths. He also supported ascetism and believed celibacy to be a holier state than marriage.

Chelčický opposed indulgences and paying masses for the dead. Later he protested against the Utraquists making compromises with the Catholic church, seeing it as a reunion with the Antichrist.

Chelčický held that apostolic succession is not determined by laying on of hands but it is a matter of the clergy following the teaching of Christ.

Author
Chelčický is the author of approximately 50 treatises that have survived until today. All are written in Czech.

 ("On Spiritual Warfare"), written in 1421, was his first major work. In it, Chelčický argued that the Taborites had participated in violence through the devil's deceit and the lust for the things of the world. He also criticized the chiliasts, opposed physical warfare and noted that obligations of debts gave lenders power over debtors.

In  ("On the Triple Division of Society") Chelčický criticized the nobility, the clergy and the middle class. He describes how they subjected the common people and rode them "as if they were beasts".

He shows how the apostles treated all people as equals, and considered Christ as the only head. It was in this book that he argued that the emperor and the pope were the two great whales that burst the net of faith. He also includes extensive commentary on the Council of Basel.

Influence

Chelčický has been called "the foremost thinker of the 15th-century Czech Hussite Reformation movement." He certainly was an influential thinker among the Bohemian brethren of his day. Beyond his own time, his influence can be seen in the Moravians (Unitas Fratrum), Unity of the Brethren (Jednota Bratrská), and even the Baptist Union in the Czech Republic (also known as the Unity of Brethren Baptists). Important similarities can be seen between his teachings and the Continental Anabaptists, and, to a lesser extent, the English Baptists, though no direct connections have been shown to exist. He emphasized the New Testament as the exclusive and final source to know the will of God. He held two sacraments: baptism and the Lord's Supper. He encouraged people to read and interpret the Bible for themselves.

Chelčický's work, specifically The Net of Faith, influenced Leo Tolstoy and is referenced in his book The Kingdom of God Is Within You. His name appears as Helchitsky in many English translations.

See also

 Christian libertarianism
 Christian pacifism
 Nonviolence
 The Slav Epic (Painting: Petr Chelčický at Vodňany: Do not repay evil with evil)

Notes

External links

 
Chelcicky's Nonviolence
The Bohemian Brethren – from Karl Kautsky's Communism in Central Europe in the Time of the Reformation
The Birth, Life, and Death of the Bohemian Revival – A historical overview of the revival that generated the Unitas Fratrum

1390s births
1460s deaths
People from Strakonice District
Writers of the Moravian Church
Czech male writers
Czech Christian pacifists
Year of birth uncertain
Year of death uncertain
Czech farmers